was a village located in Chichibu District, Saitama Prefecture, Japan.

As of 2003, the village had an estimated population of 2,920 and a density of 40.88 persons per km2. The total area was 71.42 km2.

On October 1, 2005, Ryōkami was merged into the expanded town of Ogano and no longer exists as an independent municipality.

Dissolved municipalities of Saitama Prefecture
Chichibu District, Saitama